The Abkhazian Premier League is the top association football league in Abkhazia.

History 

The league was founded in 1994 and is not recognized by FIFA or any of its confederations, therefore the winners cannot participate in UEFA/AFC competitions or World Club Cup.

The league is overseen by the Football Federation of Abkhazia. It consists of 10 football clubs and there is no relegation/promotion system between the Abkhazian Premier League and the Second Division. Premier League clubs compete for the Abkhazian Cup annually, the leagues' domestic cup competition.

Nart Sukhum is the champion team of the 2020 edition after adding 30 points, 10 wins and just 2 losses, the same campaign as the Ritsa FC team that was in second place, losing only in the tiebreaker criteria. The FC Dinamo Sukhumi team was in third place with just one point less than Nart Sukhum and Ritsa FC.

Current members (2022)

List of champions

References 

Football in Abkhazia
Football leagues in Georgia (country)